Trebedw is a small village in the  community of Llandyfriog, Ceredigion, Wales. Trebedw is represented in the Senedd by Elin Jones (Plaid Cymru) and is part of the Ceredigion constituency in the House of Commons.

References

External links 
History and textile mill; Dyfed Archaeology

Villages in Ceredigion